Cambridge County Geographies is a book series published by Cambridge University Press.

Volumes
Aberdeenshire by Mackie, Alexander
Argyllshire and Buteshire by MacNair, Peter (wikisource)
Ayrshire by Foster, John
Banffshire by Barclay, W.
Bedfordshire by Chambers, C. Gore
Berkshire by Monckton, H. W. (wikisource)
Berwickshire and Roxburghshire by Crockett, W. S. (wikisource)
Breconshire by Evans, Christopher J. (wikisource)
Buckinghamshire by Morley Davies, A.
Caithness and Sutherland by Campbell, H. F.
Cambridgeshire by McKenny Hughes, T.
Carnarvonshire by Lloyd, J. E.
Cheshire by Coward, T. A.
Clackmannan and Kinross by Day, J. P.
Cornwall by Baring-Gould, S.
Cumberland by Marr, J. E.
Derbyshire by Arnold-Bemrose, H. H. (wikisource)
Devonshire by Knight, Francis A. and Knight Dutton, Louie M.
Dorset by Salmon, Arthur L.
Dumbartonshire by Mort, F. (wikisource)
Dumfriesshire by Hewison, James K.
Durham by Weston, W. J.
East London by Bosworth, G. F.
East Lothian by Muir, T. S.
East Riding of Yorkshire by Hobson, Bernard
Essex by Bosworth, George F.
Fifeshire by Valentine, Easton S. (wikisource)
Flintshire by Edwards, J. M.
Forfarshire by Valentine, Easton S.
Glamorganshire by Wade, J. H.
Gloucestershire by Evans, Herbert A.
Hampshire by Varley, Telford (wikisource)
Herefordshire by Bradley, A. G.
Hertfordshire by Lydekker, R.
Huntingdonshire by Noble, W. M.
The Isle of Man by Quine, John
Isle of Wight by Varley, Telford
Kent by Bosworth, George F.
Kincardineshire by Kinnear, George H.
Kirkcudbrightshire and Wigtownshire by Learmonth, William
Lanarkshire by Mort, Frederick
Leicestershire by Pingriff, G. N.
Lincolnshire by Mansel Sympson, E.
Linlithgowshire by Muir, T. S.
Merionethshire by Morris, A.
Middlesex by Bosworth, G. F.
Midlothian by McCallum, Alex
Monmouthshire by Evans, Herbert A.
Moray and Nairn by Matheson, Charles
Norfolk by Dutt, W. A.
Northamptonshire by Brown, M. W.
North Lancashire by Marr, J. E.
North Riding of Yorkshire by Weston, W. J.
Northumberland by Rennie Haselhurst, S.
Nottinghamshire by Swinnerton, H. H.
Orkney and Shetland by Moodie Heddle, J. G. F. and Mainland, T.
Oxfordshire by Ditchfield, P. H.
Peebles and Selkirk by Pringle, George C. (wikisource)
Perthshire by MacNair, Peter
Radnorshire by Davies, Lewis
Renfrewshire by Mort, Frederick
Ross and Cromarty by Watson, William J.
Rutland by Phillips, G.
Somerset by Knight, Francis A. and Knight Dutton, Louie M.
South Lancashire by Wilmore, A.
Staffordshire by Smith, W. Bernard (wikisource)
Stirlingshire by Simpson, W. Douglas
Suffolk by Dutt, W. A.
Surrey by Bosworth, George F.
Sussex by Bosworth, George F.
Warwickshire by Bloom, J. Harvey
West London by Bosworth, G. F.
Westmorland by Marr, J. E.
West Riding of Yorkshire by Hobson, Bernard
Wiltshire by Bradley, A. G.
Worcestershire by Wills, Leonard J.

See also
 Victoria County History

References

Further reading

External links
 Cambridge County Geographies

Cambridge University Press books
Geography books
Series of books
Books about the United Kingdom
Counties of the United Kingdom